The Scottish Women’s Amateur Championship is the women's national amateur match play golf championship of Scotland. It was first played in 1903 and is currently organised by Scottish Golf.

The Scottish Women's Amateur Championship is contested through two phases. It begins with a 36 hole stroke play competition, with the leading competitors progressing to the knock-out match play competition.

History
The first championship was held in 1903. It was organised by the St Rule Club and played on the Old Course at St Andrews. With 46 ladies entering, there were six rounds of match-play, held over four days from 16 to 19 June, the semi-finals and final being played on separate days. It was won by Alexa Glover who beat Molly Graham by one hole. In late 1903 it was decided to hold the 1904 championship at Prestwick, St Nicholas. It was held over three days in May with the semi-final and final played on the same day and was won by Molly Graham. Following the 1904 event, the Scottish Ladies' Golfing Association was formed to run the event. The 1905 was the first organised by the association and was held at North Berwick Golf Club in June. It was won by Dorothy Campbell who beat defending championship Graham in the final, at the 19th hole.

The championship was not held from 1915 to 1919 but resumed at Cruden Bay in 1920.  Charlotte Watson beat Lena Scroggie 5&3 in the final. A Scottish Ladies Victory Tournament had been held in October 1919 on the Old Course at St Andrews. Ida Kyle won the event, beating Scroggie 3&2 in the final.

The championship was not held from 1940 to 1946. In 1951 the final was extended to 36 holes, the championship being won by Jessie Valentine who beat Moira Paterson in the final. The following year, Jean Donald beat Marjorie Peel in the final by a record score, 13&11.

The format was revised in 1971 at Royal Dornoch. A 36-hole qualifying stage was introduced with the leading 64 players playing in the match-play stage. The final was reduced to 18 holes. Belle Robertson led the qualifying by 7 strokes and she went on to win the title, beating Marjory Ferguson 3&2 in the final. In 1972 at Machrihanish, Robertson led the qualifying stage by 14 strokes and regained the title with a 5&3 win over Connie Lugton in the final. The format was revised in 1973 on the  Old Course at St Andrews, with the number of qualifiers reduced to 32. A new trophy, the Clark Rosebowl was introduced for the next 32 qualifiers. Robertson did not defend her title and the championship was won by Janette Wright who beat Aileen Wilson by two holes in the final.

In 2015 the Scottish Ladies' Golfing Association merged with the Scottish Golf Union to form Scottish Golf, which now runs the championship. From 2019 the number of qualifiers was reduced to 16, the event being reduced to three days.

Winners

Source:

References

External links
Scottish Golf

Amateur golf tournaments in the United Kingdom
Golf tournaments in Scotland
1903 establishments in Scotland
Recurring sporting events established in 1903